Conch is a common name of a number of different medium-to-large-sized sea snails. Conch shells typically have a high spire and a noticeable siphonal canal (in other words, the shell comes to a noticeable point at both ends).

In North America, a conch is often identified as a queen conch, indigenous to the waters of the Gulf of Mexico and Caribbean. Queen conches are valued for seafood and are also used as fish bait.  In the United States, a rule has been proposed to list the queen conch's conservation status as threatened.

The group of conches that are sometimes referred to as "true conches" are marine gastropod molluscs in the family Strombidae, specifically in the genus Strombus and other closely related genera. For example, Lobatus gigas, the queen conch, and Laevistrombus canarium, the dog conch, are true conches.

Many other species are also often called "conch", but are not at all closely related to the family Strombidae, including Melongena species (family Melongenidae) and the horse conch Triplofusus papillosus (family Fasciolariidae). Species commonly referred to as conches also include the sacred chank or shankha shell (Turbinella pyrum) and other Turbinella species in the family Turbinellidae. The Triton's trumpet (family Charoniidae) may also be fashioned into a horn and referred to as a conch.

Etymology
The English word "conch" is attested in Middle English, coming from Latin concha (shellfish, mussel), which in turn comes from Greek konchē (same meaning) ultimately from Proto-Indo-European root *konkho-, cognate with Sanskrit word śaṅkha.

General description 
A conch is a sea snail in the phylum Mollusca. A conch shell has superior strength and is used as a musical instrument or decoration. It consists of about 95% calcium carbonate and 5% organic matter. The conch meat is edible.

Culinary use

The meat of conches is eaten raw in salads or cooked in burgers, chowders, fritters, and gumbos. All parts of the conch meat are edible.

Conch is indigenous to the Bahamas and is typically served in fritter, salad, and soup forms. It is also eaten in the West Indies (in The Bahamas, Turks and Caicos, and Jamaica in particular); locals in Jamaica eat conch in stews, curries and other dishes. Restaurants all over the islands serve this particular seafood. In the Dominican Republic, Grenada, and Haiti, conch is commonly eaten in curries or in a spicy soup. It is locally referred to as lambi. In Puerto Rico, conch is served as a ceviche, often called ensalada de carrucho (conch salad), consisting of raw conch marinated in lime juice, olive oil, vinegar, garlic, green peppers, and onions. It is also used to fill empanadas.

In Panama, conch is known as cambombia and is often served as ceviche de cambombia, consisting of raw conch marinated in lime juice, chopped onions, finely chopped habaneros, and often vinegar.

Conch is very popular in Italy and among Italian Americans. Called sconcigli, it is eaten in a variety of ways, but most often in salads or cooked in a sauce for pasta. It is often included as one of the dishes prepared for the Feast of the Seven Fishes.

In East Asian cuisines, conch is often cut into thin slices and then steamed or stir-fried.

Eighty percent of the queen conch meat in international trade is imported into the United States. The Florida Keys were a major source of queen conches until the 1970s, but the conches are now scarce and all harvesting of them in Florida waters is prohibited and individuals who have harvested them have been punished by law enforcement.

Festival
In the Turks and Caicos Islands, the Conch Festival is held in November each year at the Three Queens Bar/Restaurant in Blue Hills. Local restaurateurs compete for the best and most original conch dishes, which are then judged by international chefs. Other competitions, events, and music performances occur.

Musical instruments

Conch shells can be used as wind instruments. They are prepared by cutting a hole in the spire of the shell near the apex and then blowing into the shell as if it were a trumpet, as a blowing horn. Sometimes a mouthpiece is used, but some shell trumpets are blown without one. Pitch is adjusted by moving one's hand in and out of the aperture; the deeper the hand, the lower the note.

Various species of large marine gastropod shells can be turned into blowing shells, but some of the best-known species used are the sacred chank or shankha Turbinella pyrum, the Triton's trumpet Charonia tritonis, and the queen conch Strombus gigas.

One of the most famous musical instruments was found in the Marsoulas cave in the Pyrenees Mountains, in France in 1932. CT scans showed how ancient humans adapted the Concho to make it a musical instrument, such as creating a mouthpiece that was held together by an organic matter like clay or wax. Researchers from the University of Sorbonne, together with a professional horn player, were able to use it again as a musical instrument and play it.

Examples of this practice in the Americas can be seen in the form of historical artifacts at the Museo Larco in Lima, Peru, and Museo Nacional de Antropología in Mexico City, Mexico.

Pearls

Many kinds of molluscs can produce pearls. Pearls from the queen conch, S. gigas, are rare and have been collectors' items since Victorian times. Conch pearls occur in a range of hues, including white, brown, and orange, with many intermediate shades, but pink is the color most associated with the conch pearl, such that these pearls are sometimes referred to simply as "pink pearls". In some gemological texts, non-nacreous gastropod pearls used to be referred to as "calcareous concretions" because they were porcellaneous (shiny and ceramic-like in appearance), rather than nacreous (with a pearly luster). The Gemological Institute of America and World Jewellery Confederation now use the simple term "pearl"—or, where appropriate, the more-descriptive term "non-nacreous pearl"—for such items, and, under Federal Trade Commission rules, various mollusk pearls may be referred to as "pearls" without qualification.

Although not nacreous, the surfaces of fine conch pearls have a unique and attractive appearance of their own. The microstructure of conch pearls comprises partly aligned bundles of microcrystalline fibers that create a shimmering, slightly iridescent effect known as flame structure. The effect is a form of chatoyancy, caused by the interaction of light rays with the microcrystals in the pearl's surface, and it somewhat resembles moiré silk.

Other uses

 Conch shells are sometimes used as decoration, as decorative planters, and in cameo making.
 In the Aztec culture, the conch played an important role in rituals, war, art, music, mythology, festivals, and even the calendar.
 In India, some artisans make souvenirs, deity idols and other crafts by carving natural conch shells by hands.
 Conch shells have been used as shell money in several cultures.
 Some American Aboriginals used cylindrical conch columella beads as part of breastplates and other personal adornment.
 In India, the Bengali bride-to-be is adorned with conch shell and coral bangles called shakha paula. It is a traditional wedding ritual for every Bengali bride.
 In India and Bangladesh, the conch is blown every day in the evening in Bengali houses as a daily ritual.
 In some Afro-Caribbean and African-American cemeteries, conch shells are placed on graves.
 In some Caribbean countries such as Jamaica and the Bahamas, cleaned queen conch shells, or polished fragments, are sold, mainly to tourists, as souvenirs or in jewellery. Responding to a 2003 recommendation from CITES, some countries in the Caribbean have banned the export of queen conch shells. CITES has also asked all countries to ban import of these shells from countries that are not complying with CITES recommendations for managing the fishery. Queen conch fisheries have been closed in several countries. Conch shells or fragments taken home by tourists from noncomplying countries may be confiscated on return to the tourist's home country while clearing customs. In the UK, conch shells are the 9th-most seized import.
Conch shells have been used as a building material since ancient times, and new research is being conducted, to replicate their material for practical uses such as bone replacement, and also in architecture, to construct stronger structures.
 In Grenada, fishermen use the conch shell as a trumpet to announce to the community that fish is available for sale. Conchs are used at carnival times in the Jouvert Jump where Diab Diab (Jab Jab) blow conch shells as part of the festivities. Especially in Guadeloupe, hearing conch shells being blown near ports at dawn and during Carnival times, too, is not uncommon. Many bands and trumpeters like Steve Turre are using the conch shell as an important instrument in their unique performances.
 In the Caribbean, broken or up-turned conch shells are embedded into the tops of outdoor walls in an effort to maintain home security.
 In Tamil Nadu, India, the conch horn is blown during funerals as an acoustic indication of the funeral and to ward off evil spirits.
 In Key West, Florida, US, a native-born resident is affectionately called a "conch".
 In Japan, a conch is horagai (or jinkai). It was used as a trumpet in special ceremonies such as a royal cremation during the Edo period.
Conch shells, (pu in Hawaiian) have been historically used as a method of communication, a tradition that is still observed in parts of modern life in Hawai'i.

Religion

Ancient Peru
The Moche people of ancient Peru worshipped the sea and often depicted conch shells in their art.

Aztec
Quetzalcoatl, the Mexican god of wind and learning, wears around his neck the "wind breastplate" ehecailacocozcatl, "the spirally voluted wind jewel" made of a conch shell. Blowing a conch was considered a religious act.

Hinduism

A shankha shell (the shell of a T. pyrum, a species in the gastropod family Turbinellidae) is often referred to in the West as a conch shell or a chank shell. This shell is used as an important ritual object in Hinduism. The shell is used as a ceremonial trumpet, as part of religious practices, for example puja. The chank trumpet is sounded during worship at specific points, accompanied by ceremonial bells and singing. As it is an auspicious instrument, it is of purity and brilliance (Om, Devas, Brahman the Almighty Supreme creator, referred to in mantras, the Gayatri mantra explains a meditation on the brilliance of the sun), it is often played in a Lakshmi puja in temple or at home.

In the story of Dhruva, the divine conch plays a special part. The warriors of ancient India blew conch shells to announce battle, as is described in the beginning of the war of Kurukshetra, in the Hindu epic the Mahabharata.

The god of preservation, Vishnu, is said to hold a special conch, Panchajanya, that represents life, as it has come out of life-giving waters. According to Hindu mythology, Devas (gods) and Asuras (demons) once decided to churn the ocean to get a special divine nectar. This divine nectar, also known as amrit, was known to give immortality to whoever drank it. All the gods were on one side of it and the demons were on the other end. The churning (samudra manthan) produced a number of things from the ocean. One of the first things to come out of it was lethal poison called halahala. Everyone was terrified, as the poison was potent enough to destroy entire creation, so they went to Lord Shiva for protection and he consumed the poison to safeguard the universe. Lord Shiva took the poison in his mouth, but did not swallow it.  Shankha also was one of divine objects that was obtained from samudra manthan.

Also, the sound of the conch is believed to drive away the evil spirits.

The blowing of the conch or "the shankha" needs a tremendous power and respiratory capacity. Hence, blowing it daily helps keep the lungs healthy.

A newlywed Bengali bride wears bangles called shakha paula, made from coral and conch-shell powder. They have been a part of Bengali custom and tradition. In an ancient era, the Bengali farming community is thought to have resided near the river. They collected conch shells and powdered them to create bangles. They also used red coral for the bangles. They gave these beautiful bangles to their wives, as they could not afford ivory bangles. They were also known as poor-man's ivory, as they were cheap substitute for ivory bangles.

Literature and the oral tradition
 In the Hindu tradition, the conch shell is used in ceremony as the sound it makes is said to correspond with higher frequency universal sounds associated with music of the spheres.

See also
 Dakshinavarti Shankh
 Lentigo pipus
 Seashell
 Seashell resonance

References

External links

Commercial molluscs
Strombidae
Endangered animals
Symbols
Mollusc shells
Mollusc common names